Bubb is a surname. Notable people with the surname include:

 Adrian Bubb (fl. 1980s), rugby league footballer
 Alvin Bubb (born 1980), Grenadian footballer and cousin of Byron
 Bradley Bubb (born 1988), Grenadian international footballer
 Byron Bubb (born 1981), Grenadian footballer and cousin of Alvin
 Clive Bubb (1936–2004),  Australian politician
 Ernest Bubb (1884–1946), Australian cricketer
 Frank W. Bubb Sr. (1892–1961), scientist and a mathematician
 George Dodington, 1st Baron Melcombe, born George Bubb (1691–1762), English politician and diarist 
 J. G. Bubb (1782-1853), sculptor of the Victorian era
 Les Bubb, mime artist from the UK
 Roy Bubb (1900–1965), Australian cricketer
 Stephen Bubb (born 1952)

See also
 Melbury Bubb, hamlet in Dorset, England 
 Bubba
 Bubble (disambiguation)
 Bub (disambiguation)

English-language surnames